Jennifer Hohl (born 3 February 1986 in Marbach, St. Gallen) is a retired Swiss professional road cyclist. She represented Switzerland at the 2008 Summer Olympics, and later earned three Swiss national championship titles in the women's elite road race (2008, 2009, and 2012).

Hohl qualified for the Swiss squad in the women's road race at the 2008 Summer Olympics by receiving one of the nation's three available berths from the UCI World Cup. Passing through the 102.6-km mark, Hohl fell into the ground after crashing her bike in a heavy collision against a small group of riders, and subsequently, abandoned her race before reaching the 3:03-barrier.

Career highlights

2007
 1st Overall, Tour de Berne, Bern (SUI)
 8th UCI European Road Championships (U23), Sofia (BUL)
2008
 1st  Swiss Championships (Road), Gansingen (SUI)
2009
 1st  Swiss Championships (Road), Nyon (SUI)
 1st Meisterschaft von Zürich, Zürich (SUI)
 1st Stage 1, Giro della Toscana Int. Femminile, Viareggio (ITA)
2010
 1st Overall, Grand Prix Oberbaselbiet, Switzerland
 4th Swiss Championships (Road), Switzerland
2011
 3rd Swiss Championships (Road), Kirchdorf (SUI)
2012
 1st  Swiss Championships (Road), Switzerland

References

External links
 
NBC 2008 Olympics profile

1986 births
Living people
Swiss female cyclists
Cyclists at the 2008 Summer Olympics
Olympic cyclists of Switzerland
Sportspeople from St. Gallen (city)